Ding Yunpeng (Ting Yün-p'eng, traditional: 丁雲鵬, simplified: 丁云鹏; c. 1547 – 1628) was a Chinese painter especially of human figures and landscapes during the Ming Dynasty (1368–1644).

Ding was born in Xiuning in the Anhui province. His style name was 'Nanyu' and his sobriquet was 'Shenghua jushi'. Ding's painting followed the style of Qiu Ying, similar to paintings from the Song Dynasty. Ding used pure and minute brush strokes for a strong and terse look and feel.

References

External links 
  Images of the Mind Borne from the Brush: The Paintings of Ding Yunpeng, 2012 English Site  in the Exhibition of Ding Yunpeng in National Palace Museum, Taipei

1547 births
1628 deaths
Painters from Anhui
Ming dynasty landscape painters
People from Huangshan
Ming dynasty painters
Buddhist artists
Religious artists